Kommune 1 or K1 was a politically motivated commune in Germany. It was created on 12 January 1967, in West Berlin and finally dissolved in November 1969. Kommune 1 developed from the extraparliamentary opposition of the German student movement of the 1960s. It was intended as a counter-model against the small middle-class family, as a reaction against a society that the commune thought was very conservative.

The commune was first located (from 19 February 1967, until the beginning of March 1967) in the empty apartment of the author Hans Magnus Enzensberger, in Fregestraße 19, as well as in the studio apartment of the author Uwe Johnson, who was staying in the United States, at Niedstraße 14 in the Berlin district of Friedenau. After Enzensberger's return from a long study trip to Moscow, they left his apartment and occupied the home of Johnson at Stierstraße 3 for a short time. They then moved to an apartment at Stuttgarter Platz and then finally moved to the second floor of the back of a tenement house in Stephanstraße 60 in the Berlin district of Moabit.

Emergence
Members of the "Munich Subversive Action" (such as Dieter Kunzelmann) and of the Berlin Sozialistischer Deutscher Studentenbund ("SDS") (such as Rudi Dutschke and Bernd Rabehl) discussed how to break from what they considered to be narrow-minded and bourgeois concepts.

Dieter Kunzelmann had the idea of creating a commune. They decided to try a life of "those passionately interested in themselves". Kunzelmann soon moved to Berlin. In Berlin, the SDS had its first "commune working group", which advanced the following ideas:
 Fascism develops from the nuclear family. It is the smallest cell of the state from whose oppressive character all institutions are derived.
 Men and women live in dependence on each other so that neither could develop freely as people.
 This cell (that is, the small family) had to be shattered.

When it was proposed that this theory should be realized as the practice of a life as a commune, many SDS members left, including Dutschke and Rabehl, who did not want to give up their marriages and lifestyles. In the end, nine men and women, as well as a child, moved into the empty house of Hans Magnus Enzensberger in Fregestrasse 19 and the studio apartment of the author Uwe Johnson in Berlin-Friedenau, who was staying in New York City at the time, on 19 February 1967. After Enzensberger's return from an extended study trip to Moscow, the communards left and occupied the main residence of Johnson in the nearby Stierstraße 3. They called themselves Kommune 1.

The early communards included the leader and main driving force Dieter Kunzelmann, Fritz Teufel, Dagrun Enzensberger (divorced wife of Hans Magnus Enzensberger), Tanaquil Enzensberger (nine years old at that time, daughter of Enzensberger), Ulrich Enzensberger (Hans Magnus Enzensberger's brother), Detlef Michel (until 25 March 1967), Volker Gebbert, Hans-Joachim Hameister, Dorothea Ridder ("the iron Dorothee"), Dagmar Seehuber and. Rainer Langhans joined in March 1967. At times, other people also lived in the premises of Kommune 1, such as Dagmar von Doetinchem and Gertrud Hemmer ("Agathe").

The communards first tried to inform each other in excruciating detail about their respective biographies, to break the old certainties. They were very different from each other. Correspondingly, the roles each of them played were soon different. Kunzelmann was the "patriarch" and made sure everyone knew it. His definition of the goals of the commune were based on his time as a "situationist" and in the "Subversive Action". He was therefore in favor of getting rid of all securities, even financial ones, which is why he scorned study grants, for example. He wanted to abolish any property, any private sphere. And he was against the principle of work, but for the principle of fun or pleasure. Everyone could and should do what he wanted, as long as it happened where everyone could see it.

Langhans, Teufel, and the others wore long hair, beaded necklaces, army jackets, or Mao suits at the urging of the women of the commune. Soon, they were paid for interviews and photographs. A sign hung plainly in the hallway of their apartment, directed at journalists: "First pay up, then speak".

The First Phase: Acts of provocation
During its entire existence, Kommune 1 was famous for its bizarre staged events that fluctuated between satire and provocation. These events served as inspiration for the "Sponti" movement and other leftist groups.

The "Pudding Assassination"
As the domestic commune life was too boring, the communards decided to turn their internal experience into actions.

The first of these was the "pudding assassination" of US Vice-President Hubert Humphrey who was scheduled to visit Berlin. On the evening of 2 April 1967, the communards met in Johnson's apartment with about 20 other people whom they knew from demonstrations. Kunzelmann presented his plan of throwing smoke bombs in the direction of the Vice President on the occasion of the state visit on 6 April. None of the others besides Langhans wanted to participate.

Police files indicate that the planned attack was revealed by a secret service agent, since eleven students were arrested by officials of Division I (Political Police) on 5 April 1967. They were supposed to have met under conspiratorial conditions and planned attacks against the life or health of Hubert Humphrey by means of bombs, plastic bags filled with unknown chemicals, or with other dangerous tools, such as stones.

Those arrested were Ulrich Enzensberger, Volker Gebbert, Klaus Gilgenmann, Hans-Joachim Hameister, Wulf Krause, Dieter Kunzelmann, Rainer Langhans and Fritz Teufel. The tabloid Bild'''s headline was "Humphrey to be assassinated", the weekly Zeit spoke of "Eleven little Oswalds". Even the New York Times featured a report on the plan of eight communards to attack the Vice-President with pudding, yogurt, and flour. Because of this bad publicity, Uwe Johnson hastily asked his friend and neighbor Günter Grass to evict the students from his apartment. The next day, the communards were released and gave their first press conference – they had become celebrities, while the press and police officials had lost face in the public eye. The publisher Axel Springer henceforth called the members of Kommune 1 "communards of horror".

The commune moved to an apartment in an old building on Kaiser-Friedrich-Straße on Stuttgarter Platz in the district of Berlin-Charlottenburg and later to Stephanstraße 60 in Berlin-Moabit. Hardly a week passed without the communards staging some kind of satiric provocation somewhere in Berlin, which made headlines in the press. In one of them, the commune climbed up the Kaiser-Wilhelm-Gedächtniskirche to throw down hundreds of Little Red books from above.

The visit of the Shah and the K1 photograph
During a demonstration in front of the Deutsche Oper Berlin building protesting against the visit of the Shah of Iran on 2 June 1967 (the death of Benno Ohnesorg), Fritz Teufel was arrested and accused of treason. It was not until December that he was released, after he and many students with him had begun a hunger strike. In the streets, sympathizers held wild demonstrations, chanting "Freedom for Fritz Teufel" and "Drive the devil out of Moabit!" (Moabit being Berlin's prison and Teufel being German for devil).

During Teufel's absence from Kommune 1, a famous photograph of the communards' naked behinds against a wall was displayed with the headline: Das Private ist politisch! ("The personal is political!")

The "Arsonist's Lawsuit"
On 22 May 1967 a department store fire in Brussels caused 251 deaths. Maoists and anti-Vietnam war protesters were soon accused of having set the fire. Kommune 1 reacted with flyers, describing "new forms of protest", writing "Holt euch das knisternde Vietnam-Gefühl, das wir auch hier nicht missen wollen!" ("Catch that crackling Vietnam feeling that we would not want to miss at home!") and asking "when do the Berlin department stores burn?" On 6 June 1967, the "Arsonist's Lawsuit" was filed against Langhans and Teufel, charging them with calling for arson. After testimony of numerous literature professors, who characterized the flyers as fiction and surrealist provocation, the court ultimately ruled in favor of Langhans and Teufel. They later told the story of the lawsuit in their 1968 book, Klau Mich ("Steal Me"), which rose to cult status.

Reactions
The hedonistic attitude of the communards, who did only what they felt like doing, not only polarized the bourgeoisie but also polarized the political Left.

The SDS especially disliked the provocative activities of the K1. The provocative flyers of the K1 ("Water cannons are paper tigers") that were signed with the acronym SDS, were a source of continual irritation. Among other things, the communards were accused of having no political interest, but merely indulging in egotism. Hence in May 1967, the SDS expelled the "revolutionary rowdies" (Bild Zeitung).

In the weekly newspaper Zeit, Klaus Hartung wrote: "Scarcely any political theory was more successful than that according to which revolutionaries have to revolutionize, according to which there will be no change in the society without a change in everyday life."

Kommune 1 developed into a kind of refuge for alternative thinkers for problems of all kinds; appeals for help arrived daily. The house was under a veritable siege by friends and groupies who worshipped Teufel and Langhans. Because of the crowd of women, especially caused by Teufel, he was expelled from the commune. He moved into a Munich commune and was later involved with the Movement 2 June.

The Second Phase: Sex, drugs and Uschi Obermaier
By the end of the 1960s, the societal climate had changed. In the late summer of 1968, the commune moved into a deserted factory on Stephanstraße in order to reorient. This second phase of Kommune 1 was characterized by sex, music, and drugs.

On 21 September 1968, the commune went to the International Song Days in Essen, the Federal Republic's first underground festival. There, Langhans met and fell in love with Uschi Obermaier, a model from Munich. She lived with the Munich-based music commune Amon Düül, but soon moved in with the communards of Kommune 1, who shared one bedroom. Soon, the press called Langhans and Obermaier the "best-looking couple of the APO". Kunzelmann did not like the openly apolitical Obermaier.

The politicization of the private sphere and the fact that Langhans and Obermaier spoke openly to the media about their relationship, about jealousy, and about "pleasure machines" constituted the next breaking of social taboos, ushering in the sexual revolution. Later, John Lennon and Yoko Ono and others followed their example.

All of a sudden, the commune was receiving visitors from all over the world, among them Jimi Hendrix, who turned up one morning in the bedroom of Kommune 1. Obermaier fell in love with him.

Her modeling fees rose sharply, she was given a lead role in Rudolf Thome's cult movie  (Red Sun, 1969), and her photographs were all over posters and magazine covers. The magazine Stern paid 20,000 Deutschmark (the price of a Porsche 911 at the time) for an interview and nude photos of Obermaier, a sum that rumors in the scene soon raised to 50,000 Mark.

The end of Kommune 1 and its legacy
Eventually, the energy of Kommune 1 was spent. Kunzelmann's addiction to heroin worsened and in summer 1969 he was expelled from the commune.

In November 1969, a gang of three Rockers raided the commune and destroyed the rooms. They had earlier helped Langhans in expelling some unwanted people from the commune, and now came back to claim their share of the 50,000 Marks that Stern supposedly had paid. The remaining occupants lost their belief in the future of Kommune 1 and dispersed. Obermaier and Langhans went to Munich. Eventually, Langhans would live with a "harem" of four ex-models, a set-up that would last for several decades.

A table from one of the rooms of the Kommune 1 was bought by the Green Party politician Hans-Christian Ströbele. During meetings around that same table, the newspaper Die Tageszeitung and the German Chaos Computer Club were founded.

See also
 Counterculture of the 1960s
 New left
 Amon Düül
 Uschi Obermaier
 Chaos Computer Club
 Manfred Grashof
 Autonomism

References

Literature
Boyle, Michael Shane. 2011. "Aura and the Archive: Confront the Incendiary Fliers of Kommune 1," in Performing Arts Resources: The Tyranny of Documents–The Performance Historian as Film Noir Detective, Ed. Stephen Johnson, New York: Theatre Library Association.
 
 Fahlenbrach, Kathrin. 2004. The Aesthetics of Protest in the Media of 1968 in Germany (conference paper). Proceedings, IX International Congress of the International Society for the Empirical Study of Literature, 2004. Available from: https://web.archive.org/web/20080530161833/http://www.arts.ualberta.ca/igel/igel2004/Proceedings/Fahlenbrach.pdf (PDF)
 Rabehl, Bernd. 2003. Die Provokationselite: Aufbruch und Scheitern der subversiven Rebellion in den sechziger Jahren. (Teil 2: Die Revolte in der Revolte: Die Kommune 1.)
 Martin Klimke, Joachim Scharloth (eds.).2007. 1968. Ein Handbuch zur Kultur- und Mediengeschichte der Studentenbewegung. Stuttgart: Metzler. 
 
 Rainer Langhans, Fritz Teufel: Klau mich. StPO der Kommune I. Edition Voltaire, Frankfurt am Main and Berlin 1968 (Series: Voltaire Handbuch 2), Reprint (without pornographic insert): Trikont Verlag, Munich 1977; Rixdorfer Verlagsanstalt, Berlin undated [1982] 
 Christa Ritter, Rainer Langhans: Herz der Revolte. Die Kommune 1 von 1967 bis 1969. Hannibal Verlag, 2005, . 
 Peter Szondi: Aufforderung zur Brandstiftung. Ein Gutachten im Prozeß Langhans / Teufel. in: Der Monat, Berlin, 19th year, issue 7, 1967, p. 24-29, also printed in: Peter Szondi: Über eine "Freie (d. h. freie) Universität". Stellungnahmen eines Philologen. Suhrkamp Verlag, Frankfurt am Main 1973 (Series: es 620)
 Josep Mº Carandell: Las comunas, alternativa a la familia'', Barcelona, Tusquets, 1972.

1967 in Germany
Communes
Defunct organisations based in Germany
Außerparlamentarische Opposition
Hippie movement
Organizations disestablished in 1969
Organizations established in 1967
Political organisations based in Germany
Intentional communities in Germany